The 2018 Rally Turkey (formally known as the Marmaris Rally Turkey 2018) was a motor racing event for rally cars that was held over four days between 13 and 16 September 2018. It marked the return and the eleventh running of Rally Turkey, last held in 2010. The event was the tenth round of the 2018 FIA World Rally Championship and its support series, the WRC-2 and WRC-3 championships. It was also the fifth and the last round of the Junior WRC championship. The event was based in Marmaris in Muğla and consists of seventeen special stages totalling  in competitive kilometres.

Coming into the event, Sébastien Loeb and Daniel Elena were the reigning rally winning crew, but they chose not to participate in this year's event. Ott Tänak and Martin Järveoja were the rally winners. Their team, Toyota Gazoo Racing WRT, were the manufacturers' winners. The Škoda Motorsport II crew of Jan Kopecký and Pavel Dresler won in the World Rally Championship-2 in a Škoda Fabia R5, while the Swedish crew of Emil Bergkvist and Joakim Sjöberg won in the World Rally Championship-3 and Junior World Rally Championship.

After five rounds' battle, Emil Bergkvist and Johan Johansson became the drivers' and co-drivers' champion of 2018 Junior World Rally Championship respectively.

Background

Championship standings prior to the event
Thierry Neuville and Nicolas Gilsoul entered the round with a twenty-three-point lead in the World Championship for Drivers and Co-drivers. In the World Championship for Manufacturers, Hyundai Shell Mobis WRT held a thirteen-point lead over Toyota Gazoo Racing WRT.

Entry list
The following crews were entered into the rally. The entry list consisted of thirteen World Rally Car entries, fifteen in the World Rally Championship-2, and fourteen entries in the World Rally Championship-3, thirteen of which were eligible to score points in the Junior World Rally Championship.

Notes
 — Driver and co-driver are eligible to score points in the FIA Junior World Rally Championship.

Report

Pre-event
Junior WRC championship will be worth double points to encourage crews to contest all five events of the championship.

Thursday
Andreas Mikkelsen, driving an i20, won the first stage of the rally, 2.5 seconds faster than Craig Breen. Ott Tänak cleared the stage in third, ahead of championship leader Thierry Neuville. Two WRC 2 cars Kajetan Kajetanowicz and Jan Kopecký completed the stage in fifth and sixth place respectively. From seventh to tenth were Esapekka Lappi, Mads Østberg, Jari-Matti Latvala and Elfyn Evans, who was the only Fiesta in top ten.

Friday
Championship leader Thierry Neuville, who was being first on the road, squeezed his i20 on top. Defending world champion Sébastien Ogier and Andreas Mikkelsen completed the day in second and third respectively. The gap between the top three was only 2.6 seconds. Jari-Matti Latvala and teammate Ott Tänak finished in fourth and fifth, with Hayden Paddon in sixth. Esapekka Lappi, who was struggling with his Yaris' differential, cleared the day in seventh place. Early leader Craig Breen suffered a puncture and dropped down to eighth place, while his teammate Mads Østberg and Elfyn Evans both retired from the day in the penultimate stage with broken suspension. Teemu Suninen completed the day in ninth place after a consistent performance, with rally veteran Henning Solberg covered the top ten.

Saturday
The second leg of the rally turned out to be disastrous for some of the crews. Friday leader and championship leader Thierry Neuville retired from the day when the front left suspension punched though his i20's bonnet in the morning's opening stage, which made Sébastien Ogier the new rally leader for a while; this lead was short-lived when Ogier's Ford Fiesta sustained damage on the front right wishbone, dropping the defending champion's lead down to fourth after a one-minute time penalty for being late due to a roadside fix. In the afternoon loop, his rally went from bad to worse — he went off the road and forced to retire from the day. Andreas Mikkelsen reclaimed the position of rally leader, but a transmission problem, which left his i20 with only rear-wheel drive all afternoon, caused him drop down to fifth overall. Craig Breen fared far worse when his C3 emitted smoke during SS11 and after that stage, the car was on fire and completely burned out, forcing the Irishman to retire from the rally. Teammate Mads Østberg suffered a turbo issue and also retired from the leg. Esapekka Lappi retired his Yaris from the event in sixth when he crashed went perching from a cliff.

The biggest beneficiary from the chaotic rally was Ott Tänak, who ended the day on top, while his teammate Jari-Matti Latvala, who overcame a hydraulic pressure issue, completed the day 13.1 seconds behind in second place. Hayden Paddon and Teemu Suninen got a trouble-free day and cleared the leg in third and fourth respectively. Andreas Mikkelsen, who was the last RC1 driver without retirement in top ten, finished the leg in fifth, over six minutes off the lead. Rally veteran Henning Solberg completed the day in sixth place, followed by Elfyn Evans, who was running under Rally2 regulations. Three WRC 2 category drivers Jan Kopecký, Simone Tempestini and Chris Ingram completed the leaderboard.

Sunday
After a four-day battle, Ott Tänak won his third consecutive rally victory in Marmaris, while teammate Jari-Matti Latvala, who had to defer to Tänak following team orders from the Toyota team management, finished 22.3 seconds behind in second place. With a 1-2 formula, Toyota Gazoo Racing WRT moved up on top on the manufacturers' championships, five points over Hyundai Shell Mobis WRT. Hayden Paddon and Teemu Suninen stayed in third and fourth, with erstwhile leader Andreas Mikkelsen recovering from a broken front right driveshaft. Rally veteran Henning Solberg, WRC 2 category winner Jan Kopecký, Simone Tempestini and Chris Ingram covered from sixth to ninth. Defending world champion Sébastien Ogier returned to the rally under Rally2 regulations and finished in tenth overall after teammate Elfyn Evans was given a team order, which ordered the Welsh to check in five minutes early. This meant Evans was given a five-minute time penalty so that the Frenchman could gained one place. He eventually ended his weekend in tenth place, but claimed four Power Stage points. The winner of the Power Stage was championship leader Thierry Neuville, who was forced to retire from the leg on Saturday. Despite his Power Stage victory, his championship lead went down to thirteen points over the hat-trick player Ott Tänak, whose championship standings went up to second place.

Classification

Top ten finishers
The following crews finished the rally in each class's top ten.

Other notable finishers
The following notable crews finished the rally outside top ten.

Special stages

Power stage
The Power stage was a 7.14 km stage at the end of the rally. Additional World Championship points were awarded to the five fastest crews.

J-WRC stage winning crews 
Junior World Rally Championship crews scored additional points. Each of the fastest stage time was awarded with one bonus point.

Penalties
The following notable crews were given time penalty during the rally.

Retirements
The following notable crews retired from the event. Under Rally2 regulations, they were eligible to re-enter the event starting from the next leg. Crews that re-entered were given an additional time penalty.

Championship standings after the rally
Bold text indicates 2018 World Champions.

Drivers' championships

Co-Drivers' championships

Manufacturers' and teams' championships

Notes

References

External links

  
 2018 Rally Turkey in e-wrc website
 The official website of the World Rally Championship

Turkey
2018
2018 in Turkish motorsport
September 2018 sports events in Turkey